"Su canción" ("") is a song recorded by Peruvian-Spanish singer Betty Missiego, written by Fernando Moreno. It is best known as the  entry at the Eurovision Song Contest 1979, held in Jerusalem. The song was internally chosen by the Spanish broadcaster, Televisión Española (TVE), as their representative in the Contest that year.

Internal selection
From 1977 to 1999, TVE used an internal selection process to select both the singer and the song to represent them at Eurovision. For 1979, Betty Missiego, a 34-year-old singer and television presenter from Peru who had previous song contest experience representing Peru at the OTI Festival 1972 in Madrid, was selected to go to Jerusalem with the song "Su canción", written and composed by Fernando Moreno.

At Eurovision
At Jerusalem, the song was the nineteenth and final song performed that evening, after 's Christina Simon with "Heute in Jerusalem". At the end of judging that evening, "Su canción" took the second-place slot with 116 points.

At the end, she implores everyone to sing along with her, so the song can become "theirs" as well. Unique that year was her use of children as backup singers of sorts, joining her in "her song". The children on stage that evening were Javier Glaria, Alexis Carmona, Beatriz Carmona, and Rosalía Rodríguez. At the end of the song, the children unfurl small banners, with "thanks" inscribed on each in English, Spanish, Hebrew and French, respectively.

As Spain was the last country to perform, it was also the last to vote. Before its points were awarded to the other countries, it had led the scoreboard by one point. When Spain itself awarded  and its song "Hallelujah" 10 points, it lost its first place and granted the host country the win.

Success
"Su canción", ending in second place, was the best showing for a Eurovision entry Spain had seen since , in which the country also placed second. It would be the best placing for Spain in the Contest until , when they would place second again.

As a result of the high placing, it is remembered as one of the more notable moments for Spain in the Contest, so much so that both Missiego and songwriter Moreno have been involved in events with OGAE, the official Eurovision fan club.

Missiego recorded "Su canción" in four different languages, besides Spanish also French ("Dès qu'un enfant chante"), Italian ("Vola l'amore") and German ("Der mann im mond").

"Su canción" was succeeded as the Spanish entry at the 1980 contest by Trigo Limpio with "Quédate esta noche".

External links
 Official Eurovision Song Contest site, history by year, 1979.
 Detailed info and lyrics, The Diggiloo Thrush, "Su canción".

References

Eurovision songs of 1979
Eurovision songs of Spain
1979 songs
Spanish-language songs
Mercury Records singles
1979 singles